Yealimi Noh (born July 26, 2001) is an American professional golfer, currently playing on the LPGA Tour. She turned pro in 2019 and qualified for the 2020 LPGA season after finishing 3rd in the qualifying school.

Amateur career
Born in San Francisco in 2001, Noh was raised in Concord, California. Noh had an impressive run in 2018. Over the course of five weeks, she won four tournaments: the California Junior Championship, the Girl's Junior PGA Championship, the U.S. Girls' Junior, and the Canadian Women's Amateur, the last three in consecutive weeks.

Professional career
Noh turned professional in early 2019. She Monday qualified for the 2019 Cambia Portland Classic and finished runner-up to Hannah Green. She finished third at the LPGA Q-Series to earn her tour card for 2020. Her best finish in 2020 was another runner-up at the Volunteers of America Classic.

Noh was selected as a captain's pick for Team USA for the 2021 Solheim Cup.

Amateur wins
2014 California Junior Championship
2015 Junior All-Star Invitational
2017 AJGA Girls Championship, Joanne Winter Arizona Silver Belle Championship, NCGA Girls Junior Championship
2018 Hana Financial Group Se Ri Pak Junior Championship, California Junior Championship, Girl's Junior PGA Championship, U.S. Girls' Junior, Canadian Women's Amateur

Source:

Results in LPGA majors
Results not in chronological order.

CUT = missed the half-way cut
NT = no tournament
T = tied

U.S. national team appearances
Amateur
Junior Solheim Cup: 2017 (winners)
Junior Ryder Cup: 2018 (winners)

Professional
Solheim Cup: 2021

Solheim Cup record

References

External links

American female golfers
LPGA Tour golfers
Solheim Cup competitors for the United States
Golfers from San Francisco
American sportspeople of Korean descent
People from Concord, California
2001 births
Living people
21st-century American women